Tribes of Redwall Badgers was published in 2001 as an accessory to the Redwall series by Brian Jacques.

Plot summary
This booklet about badgers features trivia questions, a giant poster, and profiles of many of the badger characters that are featured in the series. They include cartoons, fun facts, and the story information. 
The booklet was illustrated by Peter Standley.

References 

2001 children's books
2001 fantasy novels
Redwall books